On Trial is a 1928 American talking drama film produced and distributed by Warner Bros., and directed by Archie Mayo. The film starred Pauline Frederick, Lois Wilson, Bert Lytell, Holmes Herbert, and Jason Robards. The film is based on the 1914 Broadway play of the same name by Elmer Rice. A silent version of the film was also released on December 29, 1928.

The first film was released in 1917, starring Barbara Castleton, Sidney Ainsworth, and Mary McAllister. It was remade again in 1939 with John Litel, Margaret Lindsay, and Edward Norris.

Plot summary
A man is put on trial for the murder on his best friend. A young attorney wants to become successful and decides to defend him. However, he is very inexperienced.

Cast
 Pauline Frederick as Joan Trask
 Bert Lytell as Robert Strickland
 Lois Wilson as May Strickland
 Holmes Herbert as Gerald Trask
 Richard Tucker as Prosecuting Attorney
 Jason Robards, Sr. as Defense Attorney
 Franklin Pangborn as Turnbull
 Fred Kelsey as Clerk
 Vondell Darr as Doris Strickland
 Edmund Breese as Judge
 Edward Martindel as Dr. Morgan

Reception
According to Warner Bros records, the film earned $1,089,000 domestically and $365,000 in the rest of the world.

Preservation status
The 1928 film version of On Trial is now considered lost. However, Vitaphone soundtrack discs for the film survive and are housed at the UCLA Film and Television Archive and British Film Institute. The film's trailer also survives.

See also
List of lost films

References

External links
 
  (1917)
  (1939)

1928 films
1928 drama films
American black-and-white films
American courtroom films
American drama films
American films based on plays
Films directed by Archie Mayo
Lost American films
Transitional sound films
Warner Bros. films
Films with screenplays by Robert Lord (screenwriter)
1920s American films